Harpalus petri is a species of ground beetle in the subfamily Harpalinae. It was described by Tschitscherine in 1902.

References

petri
Beetles described in 1902